Belsué is a village under the local government of the municipality of Nueno, Hoya de Huesca, Huesca, Aragon, Spain. The village had 3 inhabitants in 2005.

References

Populated places in the Province of Huesca